Janisse Ray (born February 2, 1962) is an American writer, naturalist, and environmental activist.

Early life and education 
Ray was born in a small town, Baxley, Georgia, the county seat of Appling County, in the southeast region of the state. She is the daughter of loving parents, Franklin D. and Lee Ada Branch Ray. She grew up with one sister, Kay, and two brothers, Steve and Dell. Ray’s family was deeply rooted in the area where she grew up, going back at least six generations. Ray’s ancestors were listed in the first census in Appling county in 1820 and the town of Baxley was named for an ancestor as well. From 1980 to 1982, she attended North Georgia College where she found her passion for ecology, which led her to her career. She received a Bachelor of Arts from Florida State University and a Master of Fine Arts from the University of Montana.

Career 
Ecology of a Cracker Childhood (1999) recounts Ray's experiences growing up in a junkyard, the daughter of a poor, white, fundamentalist Christian family. In the book she surveys the ecological web she experienced as a child; including plant species (Longleaf Pine, Cypress Swamp, Wiregrass, Meadow Beauty, Liatris, Greeneyes) and animal species (Flatwood Salamander, Bachman's sparrow, Pine Warbler, Carolina Wren, Red-Cockaded Woodpecker, Eastern Bluebird, Brown-Headed Nuthatch, Yellow Breasted Chat, Red-headed woodpecker, Eastern Kingbird, Common ground dove, Quail, Gopher Tortoises) along with how she fits into this world as part of the human species. The book interweaves family history and memoir with natural history writing—specifically, descriptions of the ecology of the vanishing longleaf pine forests that once blanketed much of the South. The book won the American Book Award, the Southern Book Critics Circle Award and the Southern Environmental Law Center Award for Outstanding Writing on the Southern environment. It also was chosen for the "All Georgia Reading the Same Book" project by the Georgia Center for the Book.

In Wild Card Quilt (2003) she relates her experiences moving back home to Georgia with her son after attending graduate school in Montana. Pinhook (2005) tells the story of Pinhook Swamp, the land that connects the Okefenokee Swamp in Georgia and Osceola National Forest in Florida. Drifting into Darien, published in 2011, describes her experiences on and knowledge about the Altamaha River, which runs from middle Georgia to the Atlantic Ocean at Darien.

Ray published a book of poetry, A House of Branches (2010) and has been a contributor to Audubon, Orion and other magazines, as well as a commentator for NPR's Living on Earth. An environmental activist, she has campaigned on behalf of the Altamaha River and the Moody Swamp.

She previously taught in the Chatham University Low-Residency Master of Fine Arts Program in Creative Writing. Currently, she is a visiting professor and writer-in-residence at universities and colleges across the country. She lectures nationally on nature, agriculture, seeds, wildness, sustainability, writing, and politics of wholeness.

Personal life 
She has a son, Silas Ausable, who attended the University of Massachusetts and studied landscape architecture. She lives a simple, sustainable life in southern Georgia on Red Earth Farm with her husband and daughter. She is an organic gardener, tender on farm animals, slow-cook food, and seed saver. She is very active in her local community.

Books

 Ecology of a Cracker Childhood, memoir (Minneapolis: Milkweed Editions, 1999).
 Wild Card Quilt: Taking a Chance on Home, memoir (Minneapolis: Milkweed Editions, 2003).
 Between Two Rivers: Stories from the Red Hills to the Gulf, (Co-editor, with Susan Cerulean and Laura Newtown) nonfiction (Tallahassee: Heart of the Earth, 2004).
 Pinhook: Finding Wholeness in a Fragmented Land,, nonfiction (White River Junction: Chelsea Green Publishing Company, 2005).
 A House of Branches, poetry (Nicholasville: Wind Publications, 2010).
 Drifting into Darien: a Personal and Natural History of the Altamaha River, nonfiction (Athens: The University of Georgia Press, 2011).
 The Seed Underground: A Growing Revolution to Save Food, nonfiction (White River Junction: Chelsea Green Publishing Company, 2012).
Red Lanterns: Poems, poetry (Iris Press, 2021).
Wild Spectacle: Seeking Wonders in a World beyond Humans, nonfiction (Trinity University Press, 2021).

References

Source: Contemporary Authors Online. The Gale Group, 2005.

External links
 Milkweed Editions webpage for Ecology of a Cracker Childhood
 Wind Publications webpage for House of Branches
 Georgia Encyclopedia entry for Janisse Ray
 Whole Terrain link to Ray's articles published in Whole Terrain
 Janisse Ray and Nancy Marshall, "James Holland, Riverkeeper: Environmental Protection Along the Altamaha", Southern Spaces, August 11, 2011.
 Janisse Ray, "Sowing The Seed Underground", Southern Spaces, October 23, 2012.

1962 births
Living people
American naturalists
Chatham University faculty
People from Baxley, Georgia
Writers from Georgia (U.S. state)
Women science writers
American Book Award winners
American nature writers
American women non-fiction writers
American women academics
21st-century American women
Organic gardeners